The PlayStation 3 (PS3) is a video game console.

PS3 and variations thereof may also refer to:
 Phantasy Star III: Generations of Doom, a 1990 console roleplaying game
 PostScript 3, a page description language developed by Adobe Systems
 Psalm 3
 Windows PowerShell, version 3
 PS-3, an effects pedal by Boss Corporation